The word Kriol may mean:

People
 Belizean Creole people, also known as Kriols

Languages
 Creole language
 English-based creole language 
 The English-based Australian Kriol language
 The English-based Belizean Creole language, also called Belizean Kriol
 The English-based Bocas del Toro Creole, or Colón Creole (Kriol), spoken in Panama
 The Portuguese-based Cape Verdean Creole
 The Portuguese-based Guinea-Bissau Creole
 The English-based Torres Strait Creole

See also
Creole language
Creole peoples
Krio (disambiguation)
Kreol (disambiguation)
Kriolu
Kreyol (disambiguation)